Oumar Ballo may refer to:
 Oumar Ballo (footballer)
 Oumar Ballo (basketball)